Tha Bo is a district (amphoe) in the western part of Nong Khai province, northeastern Thailand.

Geography
Neighboring districts are (from the east clockwise): Mueang Nong Khai and Sa Khrai of Nong Khai Province; Ban Phue of Udon Thani province; Pho Tak and Si Chiang Mai of Nong Khai Province. To the northeast across the Mekong river is the Lao province Vientiane Prefecture.

History
The district dates back to the Mueang Tha Bo established in 1897, with Phra Kupradit Padi (พระกุประดิษฐ์บดี) as the first governor (Chao Mueang).

Environment
The air quality in Tha Bo in 2018 was the third worst in Thailand after Samut Sakhon and Khorat.

Administration
The district is divided into 10 sub-districts (tambons), which are further subdivided into 98 villages (mubans). There are two townships (thesaban tambons): Tha Bo covers parts of tambons Tha Bo and Nam Mong, and Phon Sa covers parts of tambon Phon Sa. There are a further 10 tambon administrative organizations (TAO).

References

External links
amphoe.com

Tha Bo